Catherine Stampfl  is a Professor of Physics at the University of Sydney and was elected as a Fellow of the Australian Academy of Science in 2019.

Career 
Stampfl received a PhD in physics from La Trobe University in 1990. She then moved to the United States where she worked at the Xerox Palo Alto Research Center and the Fritz Haber Institute of the Max Planck Society in Germany. Before her return to Australia in 2003 she worked at Northwestern University.
she then settled down in Sydney and had two children named Eva and Elke.
 
Catherine Stampfl works in interdisciplinary research across physics, engineering, chemistry and materials science. Stampfl has an international reputation for her research on the atomic and electronic structure of solids and nanostructures. She works at the University of Sydney Nano-institute, as a theoretical condensed matter physicist.

Stampfl works to predict new catalysts and new materials including those that could convert carbon dioxide into other fuels, as well as researching chemical reactions at surfaces.

Her work involves high-performance computing and first-principles calculations to develop an understanding of how matter behaves. She also works to predict new and improved materials for enhanced technology.

She describes her work "we are a bit like explorers. We try new things and we see what the calculated properties are... sometimes you will find something that has high potential".

She is noted as a "women in theoretical/computational chemistry, material science, and biochemistry".

Select publications 

 C Stampfl, CG Van de Walle (1999) Density-functional calculations for III-V nitrides using the local-density approximation and the generalized gradient approximation Physical Review B:59(8),5521.
 C Stampfl, W Mannstadt, R Asahi, AJ (2001)  Freeman Electronic structure and physical properties of early transition metal mononitrides: Density-functional theory LDA, GGA, and screened-exchange LDA FLAPW calculations. Physical Review B:63(15)155106
 M Bonn, S Funk, C Hess, DN Denzler, C Stampfl, et al. (1999) Phonon-versus electron-mediated desorption and oxidation of CO on Ru (0001)
 Science 285 (5430), 1042–1045.
 C Stampfl, CG Van de Walle (1998) Energetics and electronic structure of stacking faults in AlN, GaN, and InN. Physical Review B 57 (24), R15052

Stampfl has an H-index of 50, and over 9,200 citations as at September 2019.

Awards, honours and recognition 

 2021 — Fellow of the Royal Society of New South Wales
2019 — Fellow of the Australian Academy of Science
 2018 — Deputy Champion of the team Nanotechnology for Carbon-Neutral Manufacturing, in the Sydney Nano Grand Challenge
 2003 — ARC Federation Fellow at the University of Sydney

References 

Living people
Year of birth missing (living people)
Australian women physicists
Australian women academics
Fellows of the Australian Academy of Science
La Trobe University alumni
Academic staff of the University of Sydney
Fellows of the Royal Society of New South Wales